Matawan is a borough in Monmouth County, New Jersey.

Matawan, or the similarly spelled Mattewan, Matteawan, or Matewan may also refer to:

Matawan (or Matavan) Township, a former name of Aberdeen Township, New Jersey, in Monmouth County
Matawan Regional High School, in Aberdeen Township, New Jersey
Matawan Creek, a stream in northeastern New Jersey
Matawan, Minnesota, an unincorporated community in Waseca County
Matewan, West Virginia, a town in Mingo County
Battle of Matewan or "Matewan massacre"; a 1920 coal mine-workers' strike and attempt to unionize in Matewan, West Virginia
Matewan, a 1987 film based on the Battle of Matewan
Matteawan, New York, a former village that is one of the constituent communities of the city of Beacon, New York

See also
 Mattawa (disambiguation)
 Mattawan (disambiguation)